The Argana Group is a Permian to Triassic geological group in the western High Atlas northeast of Agadir, Morocco. Sometimes known as the Argana Formation, it contains eight geological members often divided into three formations. They include the Late Permian Ikakern Formation (members T1-T2), the Early Triassic to Carnian Timezgadiouine Formation (T3-T5), and the Late Triassic Bigoudine Formation (T6-T8). Ornithischian tracks are geographically located in Marrakesh province. Indeterminate theropod remains and tracks are geographically located in Marrakesh province.

See also 
 List of dinosaur-bearing rock formations

References

Further reading 
   
 
  
 J.-M. Dutuit. 1980. Principaux caracteres d'un genre de Dicynodonte du Trias marocain. [Principal characteristics of a dicynodont genus from the Moroccan Triassic]. Comptes Rendus Hebdomadaires des Seances de l'Academie des Sciences, Serie D: Sciences Naturelles 290(10):655-658
 J.-M. Dutuit. 1972. Découverte d'un Dinosaure ornithischien dans le Trias supérieur de l'Atlas occidental marocain [Discovery of an ornithischian dinosaur in the Upper Triassic of the Moroccan western Atlas]. Comptes Rendus de l'Académie des Sciences, Série D 275:2841-2844

Geologic groups of Africa
Geologic formations of Morocco
Permian System of Africa
Triassic System of Africa
Mesozoic Morocco
Ichnofossiliferous formations
Paleontology in Morocco